Pablo Paulino Rosario (born 7 January 1997) is a Dutch professional footballer who plays as a midfielder for Ligue 1 club Nice. He has made one appearance for the Netherlands national team in 2018.

Club career

Early career
Rosario began his football career in the youth ranks of AVV Swift, followed by a brief stint with Feyenoord, before joining his local club AFC DWS. In 2012 Dutch broadcasting company HUMAN released the documentary film The Price of Heaven which follows Rosario from the period in which he captained the D1 squad of DWS.

Having been sensationalized as the next Ronaldo by the media, Rosario is confronted with the choice of joining the youth academies of either Ajax, Feyenoord or PSV, the top three clubs in the country. Rosario eventually decided for Ajax and in 2010 he joined the B2 squad (under-16) under coach Orlando Trustfull.

Almere City
In 2014 Rosario transferred to Ajax's partner club Almere City. On 7 August 2015, he made his debut for the first team in the Eerste Divisie, the second tier of professional football in the Netherlands, in a 3–3 draw at home against VVV-Venlo. He was subbed on by head coach Maarten Stekelenburg in the 59th minute for Soufyan Ahannach.

PSV
On 25 July 2016, Pablo Rosario signed a four-year deal for Dutch club PSV.

Nice
On 27 July 2021, Pablo Rosario signed for French club Nice.

International career
Born in the Netherlands, Rosario is of Dominican descent. He made his international debut playing for the Netherlands under-16 side in a friendly match against Austria U-16 on 9 February 2013. On 12 November 2015, he made his debut for the Netherlands U19 in a 2016 UEFA European Under-19 Championship qualification match against England U19 which ended in a 2–2 draw.

Rosario earned his first full international call up when Ronald Koeman named him in the Netherlands squad in October 2018. He made his international debut in a friendly against Belgium on 16 October, coming on as a half-time substitute.

Career statistics

Club

Honours
PSV
 Eredivisie: 2017–18

Nice
 Coupe de France runner-up: 2021–22

References

External links
 
 Netherlands U19 stats at OnsOranje
 

1997 births
Living people
Dutch footballers
Association football midfielders
Netherlands international footballers
Netherlands youth international footballers
Dutch people of Dominican Republic descent
Eredivisie players
Eerste Divisie players
Ligue 1 players
Almere City FC players
PSV Eindhoven players
Jong PSV players
OGC Nice players
Dutch expatriate footballers
Dutch expatriate sportspeople in France
Expatriate footballers  in France
AVV Swift players
Footballers from Amsterdam